Tatsuzō, Tatsuzo or Tatsuzou (written: 達三, 辰三 or 達蔵) is a masculine Japanese given name. Notable people with the name include:

, Japanese hurdler
, Japanese writer
, Japanese potter
, Japanese architect

Japanese masculine given names